The WayOut Club is a nightclub venue currently in [BJs White Swan in Commercial Rd], London. Formed in 1993, it is one of London's best known transgender venues and was the first to hold a regular Saturday night event.

The WayOut Club was founded in 1993 by Vicky Lee and Steffan Whitfield. Its first venue was Jamisons in Goodge Street after a year it moved to Maceys in Duke St and then to a restaurant under the Scotch House in Knightsbridge. It used Circa in Berkley Sq. There was a short spell in a restaurant in Great Titchfield St and a shorter spell under the theater showing Cats in Drury Lane. 

The club moved from venue to venue around the City of London several times before settling at Charlie's in Crosswall (off Minories) in the City of London in 1998, where it remained for 15 years. In 2008 the club won an online people's vote award from transgender charity Sparkle for "Best Transgender Nightclub". In June 2012 Charlie's lease ran out and had to close and the club moved around the corner to 2AD and then to Abbey in Minories. Abbey gave up its Saturday late licence and Vicky Lee took the club to Gilt in Crutched Friars. Gilt changed ownership and closed for refurbishment and again the club moved, this time to two venues The Minories for 3 Saturdays per month and Mary Janes for one Saturday per month  both in Minories. Mary Janes was taken over and refurbished but The Minories was now able to offer every Saturday. These rapid moves stopped in 2016 and The WayOut Club was steady at The Minories for 7 years. Occasionally to help The Minories the club would use a nearby "sister bar" bar The Duke of Somerset.  Then along came covid on March 23, 2020 – the club closed and did not reopen until November 2021 with a record 450 people returning to party. The club operated on the second and last Saturday as visitors gradually returned after covid

But in September 2022, Stonegate owners of The Minories changed their policy to promoters and Vicky Lee quit and moved the club to BJs White Swan in 556 Commercial Rd E14 7JD taking the offer of one Saturday per month. The club has been rebuilding since covid and venue changes in 2023 monthly on the THIRD Saturday of every month with two floors, Ground floor bar open mi, cabaret, chill and chat and the basement bar dance. 

The WayOut Club's performances were led by female impersonator Steffan Whitfield, until his death from cancer in 2005. His stage partner and co-founder of the club, trans woman Vicky Lee, took over maintaining the club's reputation for trans based entertainment and as a safe haven for transgender and their allies and all that respect them.

The WayOut Club has been a breeding ground for transgender and drag talent. The club has held talent searches and offers a guest spot before the booked show to anyone with a talent to share. Many of those that have taken up this offer have gone on to perform regularly at WayOut and other venues.

In 2022 Basque film director Izaskun Arandia premiered her documentary MY WAY OUT telling the story of The WayOut Club featuring Vicky Lee her partner Lesley and club regulars Geri Love, Andi and Kam Angel. The documentary happens by circumstance to document the blow that covid brought to the club. its shut down, re-launch and its efforts to rebuild... 
https://cineuropa.org/film/429860/
https://www.sansebastianfestival.com/2022/sections_and_films/zinemira/7/703886/in
http://www.izarfilms.com/feature-films.html

References

External links 

Nightclubs in London
LGBT nightclubs in London
Music venues in London
Music venues completed in 1993
1993 establishments in England
1993 in London